Bullion is non-ferrous metal that has been refined to a high standard of elemental purity. The term is ordinarily applied to bulk metal used in the production of coins and especially to precious metals such as gold and silver. It comes from the Anglo-Norman term for a melting-house where metal was refined, and earlier from French , "boiling". Although precious metal bullion is no longer used to make coins for general circulation, it continues to be held as an investment with a reputation for stability in periods of economic uncertainty. To assess the purity of gold bullion, the centuries-old technique of fire assay is still employed, together with modern spectroscopic instrumentation, to accurately determine its quality.

As investment 
The specifications of bullion are often regulated by market bodies or legislation. In the European Union, the minimum purity for gold to be referred to as "bullion", which is treated as investment gold with regard to taxation, is 99.5% for gold bullion bars and 90% for bullion coins.

Investors may choose to purchase physical gold bullion for several reasons to attempt to hedge against currency risks, inflation risks, geopolitical risks, or to add diversification to an investment portfolio.

London bullion market 
The London bullion market is an over-the-counter market for wholesale trading of gold and silver. The London Bullion Market Association (LBMA) coordinates activities of its members and other participants in the London bullion market. The LBMA sets and promotes quality standards for gold and silver bullion bars. The minimum acceptable fineness of the Good Delivery Bars is 99.5% for gold bars and 99.9% for silver bars. Bars with a purity less than these may not be referred to as "bullion".

Coins 
Bullion coins are contemporary precious metal coins minted by official agencies for investment purposes. Some bullion coins have been used as currency throughout the 20th century, such as the Maria Theresa thaler and the Krugerrand. However, modern bullion coins generally do not enter common circulation despite having legal tender status and nominal face value. Some modern bullion coins are produced as both business strike and collectible proof and uncirculated versions, such as the American Silver Eagle and American Gold Eagle coins. Private mint strikes called bullion rounds, bullion wafers, or bullion bars are typically sold at prices slightly above the underlying prevailing precious metals spot price commensurate with their overall precious metal content, whereas collectible versions are sold at a significant premium over their actual precious metal bullion melt value. In some cases, the grade and mintages of privately struck rounds, bars, or wafers can affect their value as a collectible too, so they can too at times be considered collectible numismatic pieces rather than bullion items.

Uses 

A range of professional market participants is active in the bullion markets, such as banks, fabricators, refiners, and vault operators or transport companies, as well as brokers. They provide facilities for the refining, melting, assaying, transporting, trading, and vaulting of gold and silver bullion.

Besides the direct bullion market participants, other professional parties such as investment companies and jewelers use bullion in the context of products or services which they produce or offer to customers. For example, shares of the world's largest gold exchange-traded fund, the SPDR Gold Shares, represent a gold spot price mimicking derivative although shareholders in popular gold ETFs such as GLD are almost always unsecured creditors, meaning they own no vaulted gold bullion potentially underlying the exchange-traded fund (ETF). Investors often prefer to own bullion outright over ETFs due to the minimization of counter-party risks inherent.

Private individuals use bullion primarily as an investment or as a long term store of value. Gold bullion and silver bullion are the most important forms of physical precious metals investments. Bullion investments can be considered as insurance against inflation or economic turmoil, their sole direct counterparty risk is theft or government confiscation.

Compared to numismatic coins, bullion bars or bullion coins can typically be purchased and traded at lower price premiums over the fluctuating spot price and their trading bid/ask spreads or buy/sell price differences are closer to the values of the contained precious metals.

See also
 Bullion coin
 Bullionism
 Official United States bullion coins
 Inflation hedge
 List of bullion dealers
 West Point Mint

References 

Precious metals
Metallic objects